Fariz Mammadov (born April 15, 1980 Aghdam, USSR) is an Azerbaijani professional boxer and current European welterweight champion with the World Boxing Organization.

Professional career 
On 4 June 2014, he gained the European welterweight title in the WBO after knocking out Matthias Pelk of Germany.

Professional record

Personal life
Aside from the sport, he served 7 years in prison on various assault charges. He has been practicing Islam since he was around the age of 25.

References

External links 

1980 births
Living people
Azerbaijani male boxers
Sportspeople from Baku
Welterweight boxers